The Lost Songs Vol. 1 is a digital album by Outlawz, released March 23, 2010 on Outlaw Recordz/1Nation.

Track listing

References

External links 
 OutlawzMedia.net Official Website

2010 albums
Outlawz albums
Gangsta rap albums by American artists